The Mainpuri–Etawah line is a railway line in northern India. It connects  to  via Saifai.

History
Foundation stone of this railway track was laid in 2004 by then-President of India Dr. A. P. J. Abdul Kalam in Saifai.

On December 28, 2016 first time a passenger train (71910-Agra Cantonment – Mainpuri DEMU) run on this railway track.

In 2019, Bharat Heavy Electricals Limited got the order for electrification of the track. Electrification of the track was completed in February 2022.

Route and halts

References

5 ft 6 in gauge railways in India
Railway lines in Uttar Pradesh

Mainpuri
Mainpuri district
Saifai
Transport in Saifai
Transport in Etawah
Etawah district